Tribbett is an unincorporated community located in Washington County, Mississippi.

Tribbett is home to Six Mile Farms, LLC, the only commercial popcorn company in Mississippi.  Six Mile Farms grows, processes and packages Crop to Pop popcorn.

References

Unincorporated communities in Washington County, Mississippi
Unincorporated communities in Mississippi